Mycobacteroides saopaulense (formerly Mycobacterium saopaulense) is a species of bacteria from the phylum Actinomycetota belonging to the genus Mycobacteroides that was first isolated from a human patient undergoing LASIK surgery. It has also been isolated from turtles and cows. A strain isolated from mangroves has been demonstrated to produce clavulanic acid and streptomycin. The genome of M. saopaulense contains a tRNA array that contains a long non-coding RNA called GOLDD. M. saopaulense is susceptible to amikacin, kanamycin, and clarithromycin.

References

Acid-fast bacilli
saopaulense
Bacteria described in 2015